William Ferdon House, also known as Ferdon Hall, is a historic home located at Piermont in Rockland County, New York. It was built about 1835, and is a two-story, Greek Revival style frame dwelling.  It features a monumental front portico supported by six Ionic order columns.  It has modern two-tiered flanking wings and a rear verandah.  It was the home of U.S. Congressman John W. Ferdon (1826-1884).

It was listed on the National Register of Historic Places in 2011.

References

Houses on the National Register of Historic Places in New York (state)
Greek Revival houses in New York (state)
Houses completed in 1835
Houses in Rockland County, New York
National Register of Historic Places in Rockland County, New York